Mobitel Iraq is the first mobile 3G operator in Iraq. It was launched commercially in February 2007. Mobitel was licensed by the Kurdistan Regional Government of Iraq to operate in all Kurdish regions. Mobitel currently covers Erbil Governorate and Duhok Governorate and is in the planning phase to cover Sulaimaniyah Governorate. 
In July 2007, Mobitel was the first operator in Iraq to start 3.5G services.

Services 
Mobitel offers basic 3G services such as broadband Internet, video calling and others. Mobitel was facing interconnection problems with major telecom operators in Iraq.

See also
 Zain Iraq
 AsiaCell
 Korek
 Telephone numbers in Iraq

External links 
Official website

Mobile phone companies of Iraq
Iraqi brands